WJTY (88.1 FM) is an owned and operated affiliate of Family Life Radio, licensed to Lancaster, Wisconsin, and serving all of Southwest Wisconsin, and parts of Northeast Iowa. The station's format consists of Christian contemporary music and Christian talk and teaching.

History
The station began broadcasting March 11, 1983, airing a religious format, and was owned by Joy Public Broadcasting. In 2007, the station was sold to Family Life Communications.

References

External links
 Family Life Radio's website
 

JTY
Family Life Radio stations
Radio stations established in 1983
1983 establishments in Wisconsin